Lord Pentland may refer to:

 John Sinclair, 1st Baron Pentland (1860–1925), Scottish politician
 Henry Sinclair, 2nd Baron Pentland (1907–1984), president of the Gurdjieff Foundation in America
 Paul Cullen, Lord Pentland (born 1957), Scottish judge and former politician